Donald Patrick Murray (born July 31, 1929) is an American actor best known for his breakout performance in the film Bus Stop (1956, with Marilyn Monroe), which earned him a nomination for Academy Award for Best Supporting Actor. His other films include A Hatful of Rain (1957), Shake Hands with the Devil (1959, with James Cagney), One Foot in Hell (1960, with Alan Ladd), The Hoodlum Priest (1961), Advise & Consent (1962, with Henry Fonda and Charles Laughton), Baby the Rain Must Fall (1965, with Steve McQueen), Conquest of the Planet of the Apes (1972), Deadly Hero (1975), and Peggy Sue Got Married (1986, with Kathleen Turner).

Murray starred in television series such as The Outcasts (1968–1969), Knots Landing (1979–1981), and Twin Peaks (2017).

Early life and career

Murray was born in 1929, the second of three children, to Dennis Aloisius Murray, a Broadway dance director and stage manager, and Ethel Murray (née Cook), a former Ziegfeld Follies performer.

Murray attended East Rockaway High School (class of 1947) in East Rockaway, New York, where he played football and was on the track team. He was a member of the student government, glee club, and joined the Alpha Phi Chapter of the Omega Gamma Delta Fraternity. Upon graduation from high school, he studied at the American Academy of Dramatic Arts. After graduating, he soon made his Broadway debut in the play The Rose Tattoo (1951), as Jack Hunter.

A member of the Brethren Church, Murray registered as a conscientious objector during the Korean War, when many young American men were being drafted into the armed forces. Murray was assigned to alternative service in Europe, where he helped orphans and war casualties.

In 1954, he returned from Europe to the United States and acting. He starred alongside Mary Martin in the stage version of The Skin of Our Teeth. Upon seeing his performance in the play, director Joshua Logan decided to cast him in 20th Century Fox's film adaptation of Bus Stop, a play by William Inge.

Film and television career

Don Murray's role as Beauregard "Beau" Decker in Bus Stop (1956) marked his film debut. He starred alongside Marilyn Monroe, who played Cherie, the object of his desire. His performance as the innocent cowboy who is determined to get Cherie was well received, and he was nominated for a BAFTA for Most Promising Newcomer and for the Academy Award for Best Supporting Actor.

In 1957, Murray starred as reserved, married bookkeeper Charlie Sampson in The Bachelor Party. That same year he starred in one of his most successful roles, that of Johnny Pope in the drama A Hatful of Rain. Despite director Fred Zinnemann's intention to typecast the actor as the comical brother Polo, Murray insisted on playing the lead. Thus he portrayed Johnny Pope, a morphine-addicted Korean War veteran. The film was one of the first to show the effects of drug abuse on the addicted and those around him.

Murray starred as a blackmailed United States senator in Advise & Consent (1962), a film version of a Pulitzer Prize-winning novel by Allen Drury. The movie was directed by Otto Preminger and cast Murray opposite Henry Fonda and Charles Laughton. He also co-starred with Steve McQueen in Baby the Rain Must Fall (1965), and played the ape-hating Governor Breck in Conquest of the Planet of the Apes (1972).

In 1976, Murray starred in the film Deadly Hero. In addition to acting, Murray directed a film based on the book The Cross and the Switchblade (1970).
He starred with Otis Young in the ABC western television series The Outcasts (1968–1969) featuring an interracial bounty hunter team in the post-Civil War West.

In 1979, Murray starred as Sid Fairgate on the long-running prime-time soap opera Knots Landing. He also scripted two episodes of the program in 1980. In 1981, Murray decided to leave the series after two seasons to concentrate on other projects, but some sources say he left over a salary dispute. The character's death was notable at the time, because it was considered rare to kill off a star character. The death came in the second episode of season three, following season two's cliffhanger in which Sid's car careened off a cliff. To make viewers doubt that the character had actually died, Murray was listed in the credit sequence for season three; in fact, season three revealed that Fairgate had survived the plunge off the cliff (thus temporarily reassuring the viewers), but died shortly afterwards in hospital. Although he effectively distanced himself from the series after that, Murray later contributed an interview segment for Knots Landing: Together Again, a reunion special made in 2005.

Retrospective
In July 2014, a retrospective of Murray's films was held at the Roxie Theatre in San Francisco.

Personal life
In 1956, Murray married Hope Lange, with whom he had co-starred in Bus Stop. They had two children, Christopher and Patricia. They divorced in 1961. In 1962, he married Elizabeth Johnson and then had three children, Coleen, Sean, and Michael.

Film

Feature films

Television films

Television

Awards and nominations

References

External links

 
 

1929 births
Living people
American male television actors
American male stage actors
American male film actors
Male actors from California
People from East Rockaway, New York
American Academy of Dramatic Arts alumni
20th-century American male actors
21st-century American male actors
East Rockaway High School alumni